Åkrogen (lit.: River-nook) is an urban, public beach and park in the northern parts of Aarhus, Denmark. 

Åkrogen is situated in both the neighborhood of Risskov and the suburb of Egå on the Bay of Aarhus at Egå Marina. The beach park is divided by the marina in a southern and a northern section. Kalø Vig and Helgenæs is in the east and a bit inland to the west is the lake of Egå Engsø. 

It is coarse sandy beach with gravel and several coastal protections composed of rows of boulders extending into the sea. A few short stretches of the beach are broader with white sand. Saline content is 20-35‰ and there's a weak northbound current. 

Åkrogen is a popular beach for windsurfers and kitsurfers due to the shallow waters and brisk winds. Each beach section is equipped with a  jetty extending into the sea, from which small watercraft can be landed or launched. The Canadian newspaper "The Globe and Mail" voted Åkrogen one of the 10 best beaches in the world in 2008.

The beach is maintained in conjunction with two park areas south and north of the Egå Marina. The southern section is situated along the Egå river where it terminates in the Kattegat sea. Both park sections comprise large grassy areas, trees and rows of bushes, designed to provide windbreaks and limited privacy for beachgoers and sunbathers. The grass extends to the beach itself, providing enough room to fly kites or play team sports and there is a playground for children.

Access  
The park lies at end of the cul-de-sac Åkrogs Strandvej, which culminates in a parking lot with room for some 20 cars and a parking space for the public buses that serve the area. Buses run from central Aarhus and the university to the bus stops in the area. Danish National Cycle Route 5 runs along the coast of eastern Jutland from Odder Municipality to central Aarhus, passing the Docklands, before it leads north past Den Permanente and Bellevue Beach. The route eventually reach Åkrogen and continue further north. A coastal footpath leads most of the way from Riis Skov in the south.

Safety 
   
Åkrogen is not a Blue Flag beach and there are no life guards in either summer or winter but both the south and north sections has a safety station with a lifesaver and the entire park is located in a populated area. Aarhus Municipality frequently tests the water for harmful bacteria and algae and rates all beaches on a yearly basis. In 2014 and 2015 the beach received the highest possible 3/3 rating. 

Warning signs signals the restricted beach stretch.

References

Sources 
 Stadsarkitektens kontor (2003): Lokalplan nr. 684, Aarhus Municipality . The local plan for the area.

External links  

 Arkitema: Åkrogen . A building project by the beach.
 Aarhus Kommune: Åkrogen - bynær strand 

Beaches of Aarhus
Parks in Aarhus